The Basilicata regional election of 2010 took place on 28–29 March 2010.

The incumbent President Vito De Filippo (PD) was elected for a second-consecutive term by a landslide, thus becoming the most voted candidate in 2010 regional elections.

Results

Voter turnout

References

Elections in Basilicata
2010 elections in Italy